Melvin Smith may refer to:

 Mel Smith (1952–2013), English comedian, actor, film director, writer, and producer
 Melvin H. Smith (1934–2001), British Columbia lawyer and expert on the Canadian constitution